Variimorda ihai is a species of tumbling flower beetles in the subfamily Mordellinae of the family Mordellidae.

Subspecies
Variimorda ihai boninensis Nomura, 1975
Variimorda ihai ihai Chûjô, 1959

References

External links
 Biolib
 Fauna Europaea

Mordellidae
Beetles of Europe
Beetles described in 1959